The von Quitzow family is a noble family of Brandenburg, whose power in the late fourteenth and early fifteenth century was so great that this period of Brandenburg history is sometimes called the "Age of the von Quitzows." Its most famous sons were the robber barons, the brothers Dietrich (born 1366) and Hans (born 1370). 

German families
Margraviate of Brandenburg